Faust: Love of the Damned is a 2000 Spanish English-language superhero horror film directed by Brian Yuzna. It is adapted from a screenplay by David Quinn and Miguel Tejada-Flores based on the comic book of the same name by Tim Vigil and David Quinn. It was produced by Ted Chalmers, Carlos, Julio and Antonio Fernández, Bea Morillas, Miguel Torrente and Brian Yuzna. It premiered at the Sitges International Fantastic Film Festival on 12 October 2000.

The film, which was the first of nine to be produced by Filmax's Fantastic Factory label, won the award for Best Special Effects at the 2000 Catalan International Film Festival in Sitges, Spain.

Plot 

Arriving to a crime scene, officer Dan Margolies (Jeffrey Combs) investigates a brutal scene of several mutilated bodies. He is attacked by an assailant wearing metal gauntlets with long, claw-like blades. The assassin almost kills Margolies but stops after seeing a man in the shadows. After taking him to a psychiatric hospital, Margolies meets Doctor Jade De Camp, who believes she can help the patient. De Camp observes the patient staring at a death metal CD after attempting to use musical therapy on him. She plays the CD, driving the patient into a rage but recovering his memory.

The assailant reveals his name to be John Jaspers (Mark Frost). John sold his soul to the mysterious M (as for Mephistopheles) (Andrew Divoff) in order to avenge the death of his girlfriend, Blue (Jennifer Rope), who was murdered by a gangster. M gives John the clawed gauntlets and warns him that he will regret their deal in the future. John, using his new weapons, kills the gangster and his men. However, John learns he now has become M's slave and cannot break the contract he signed in exchange for the gauntlets and power.

De Camp does not believe John's story and continues trying to treat him. Later, De Camp presents her findings to Margolies, who researches M and the secret society that he belongs to called The Hand. Back at the hospital, John is taken by M's henchmen who drug him and throw him in an empty grave. John is buried alive and De Camp is taken by M. John finds himself in Hell where he is attacked by a skeleton. After decapitating the skeleton and retrieving his gauntlets, John escapes the grave. A shadow of his body changing is seen on the overhead tombstone which has the inscribed name 'Faust'.

Before De Camp is taken away, John – now transformed into the devil Faust – arrives, killing the men and saving De Camp. A survivor from the attack returns to M's mansion to inform him of what happened, but is seduced and killed by M's wife Claire. De Camp returns home after talking with Margolies, who has gotten closer to finding out M's true motives and work with various people over the years. While home, De Camp finds out John is there and seeking her help to stop the bloodlust he feels. However, when she mentions police outside, John becomes angered and transforms into Faust upon realizing that the police are working for M.

Faust kills the police and chases after the fleeing De Camp. He corners her on a subway and begs her to come with him. The police chief, working for M, also arrives to take De Camp. Faust cuts the subway train in half and rescues De Camp from the police. Faust takes her to his old apartment where the two start to have sex, but stop when De Camp begins screaming. She tells John that she was raped as a child but cannot remember the man's face, instead only being able to remember smooth, amorphous features. The two embrace and rest. Back at M's mansion, the police chief interrupts M's meeting to reprimand him for not telling about John's power. Margolies, hiding in the house, witnesses M kill the chief. M discovers Margolies shortly after.

Margolies calls De Camp to meet at M's home. However, it is revealed that he has betrayed her and allied with M. M plans to use De Camp to lure John for a demonic ritual he intends to conduct. M is betrayed, however, when Claire has his doctor give him a poisoned syringe of medicine. M kills the doctor for his disloyalty before collapsing. Claire shoots M in the head with a shotgun and tortures De Camp in extreme sadomasochistic fashion. De Camp becomes corrupted, while M is revealed to still be alive and begins preparing for the ritual.

John returns to the bridge where he first met M and sees a vision of De Camp in danger. He rushes to her aid and crashes The Hand's ritual as Faust, but cannot hurt M because of their contract. Defeated, he turns back into John when the traumatized De Camp rejects him for M. M proceeds with the ritual, killing Claire by removing a snake from her stomach and letting it slither into Margolies' mouth. Margolies dies and a gate to Hell is opened. M rapes De Camp in order to humiliate John, but her childhood trauma snaps her back to full awareness and she is able to remember that it was her father who had assaulted her. M summons a demon from the gate to Hell which proceeds to burn all of his followers to death. De Camp knocks M unconscious and frees John, who kills the demon as Faust.

M tortures John, but De Camp offers herself to him in exchange for John's freedom from their contract and his soul returned. M agrees and burns the contract, but in doing so John loses his powers and his earlier injuries begin to take effect. Now free, John stands up and fatally stabs M, but succumbs to his wounds while De Camp mourns over his body.

Cast 
 Mark Frost as Jonathan "John" Jaspers / Faust
 Isabel Brook as Jade de Camp
 Jennifer Rope as Blue 
 Jeffrey Combs as Lt. Dan Margolies
 Andrew Divoff as M (Mephistopheles)
 Mónica Van Campen as Claire

Release 
Faust: Love of the Damned premiered at Sitges Film Festival on 12 October 2000.  It was released theatrically in late October 2000.

Trimark released it on DVD in 2001, and Mosaic released a DVD in the UK in January 2002.  Arrow Video re-released the DVD on 18 April 2011, containing several special features.

Reception 

AllMovie's review of the film was mixed, writing "Check your brain at the door and eat up this grisly eye candy." Jonathan Holland of Variety described it as "entertaining in a voyeuristic way but also as corny, crude and excessive as they come." Gareth Jones of Dread Central rated it 2/5 stars and called it "utter, utter trash" that is a guilty pleasure. Bloody Disgusting rated it 4/5 stars and wrote that it was much better than expected, though cheesy and corny in spots. Patrick Naugle of DVD Verdict called it "low budget horror slop with lots of T&A" of interest mostly to Yuzna fans.

Soundtrack 

The film's soundtrack was released through Roadrunner Records and featured songs by heavy metal artists. Machine Head's "Take My Scars" was used as the film's theme song, playing over the film's opening credits. The band's song "The Blood, the Sweat, the Tears" is also featured in the film, but not on the soundtrack. Other songs included in the film but not the soundtrack are "Remanufacture" by Fear Factory, "Lady Bird" by Baby Fox, "Def Beat" by Junkie XL, and "Breed Apart" by Sepultura.

Track listing

References

External links 
 
  
 

2000 films
2000 horror films
2000s exploitation films
2000s superhero films
2000s action horror films
Demons in film
English-language Spanish films
Films about rape
Films about Satanism
Films based on American comics
Films directed by Brian Yuzna
Films shot in Barcelona
Live-action films based on comics
Spanish horror films
Spanish supernatural horror films
Spanish splatter films
Spanish action films
Spanish dark fantasy films
Spanish films about revenge
Spanish vigilante films
Superhero horror films
Supervillain films
Works based on the Faust legend
2000s English-language films
Spanish superhero films